This article presents a list of Indonesian provinces sorted by their gross regional product nominal (GRP Nominal) per capita.

Methodology 
GRP Nominal is the regional or provincial counterpart of the national gross domestic product, the most comprehensive measure of national economic activity. The Statistics Indonesia (Badan Pusat Statistik) derives GRP for a province as the sum of the GRP Nominal originating in all the industries in the province at current prices market.

List of Indonesian administrative divisions by GRP Nominal, with 14,140 IDR = US$1 term of Nominal while 4,875.86 IDR = Int$1 term of PPP. Note some provinces have little population and large oil, gas, or mining revenues, and therefore GRP Nominal does not reflect consumer demand.

List

2022 Per Capita

See also
 Economy of Indonesia
 List of Indonesian provinces by GDP
 List of Indonesian provinces by Human Development Index
 List of Indonesian cities by GDP
 List of ASEAN country subdivisions by GDP

References

GDP per capita
Provinces of Indonesia by GRP per capita
GRP
Indonesia